Sinématiali is a town in northern Ivory Coast. It is a sub-prefecture of and the seat of Sinématiali Department in Poro Region, Savanes District. Sinématiali is also a commune.

In 2014, the population of the sub-prefecture of Sinématiali was 37,795.

Villages
The 91 villages of the sub-prefecture of Sinématiali and their population in 2014 are:

Notes

Sub-prefectures of Poro Region
Communes of Poro Region